Collins Scrabble Words (CSW, formerly SOWPODS) is the word list used in English-language tournament Scrabble in most countries except the US, Thailand and Canada. The term SOWPODS is an anagram of the two abbreviations OSPD (Official Scrabble Players Dictionary) and OSW (Official Scrabble Words), these being the original two official dictionaries used in various parts of the world at the time. Although the two source dictionaries have now changed their respective titles, the term SOWPODS is still used by tournament players to refer to the combination of the two sources. There has not been any actual hard-copy list produced called SOWPODS, although the current Collins Scrabble Words, or CSW, is in effect the full SOWPODS list by a different name.

Currently the two main sources for the words making up the combined list (generally known as Collins) are:
 The British words. Derived from two sources; the Collins English Dictionary and the Collins Corpus, and
 The American words. From the NASPA Word List, formerly Official Tournament and Club Word List, or TWL, derived from the Merriam-Webster's Dictionary and four other collegiate dictionaries. Latest version is NWL2020.

History

In 1980 in the United Kingdom, the Chambers Dictionary replaced the Shorter Oxford Dictionary as the official choice for arbitration of the British National Scrabble Championship. In 1988 for the first time a single list of all the valid words, without the ambiguity of discussing conjugations, declensions and plurals was published under the title Official Scrabble Words from Chambers (this would come to be known as OSW). North American Scrabble was using the Official Scrabble Players Dictionary (OSPD), hence when the first World Scrabble Championship took place in 1991 words from either word source were allowed.

Over the following years there was disagreement in the competitive Scrabble community over the desirability of a combined word source, which came to be known as SOWPODS as an easily pronounced anagram of OSW and OSPD. Australia changed all its rated tournaments to using the SOWPODS word list in 1994, while the UK made the same change in 2001. This latter move coincided with the publication of the first official book to contain all words from OSW and OSPD (Chambers' Official Scrabble Words: International Edition).

In December 2003, Collins took over the publication of the official word list sanctioned by WESPA, and the current edition is CSW22.

The only change from CSW19 to CSW22 is the deletion of about 400 words deemed to be hate speech. This is following a directive from Mattel, who committed to ongoing review and removal of words and definitions, removing hate speech from the game and obliging Collins publisher as a licensee to implement these changes.

Word count

See also
 NASPA Word List

References

External links

 www.collinsdictionary.com – Collins Scrabble Word Finder

Scrabble lexica
English dictionaries